Hyperolius laurenti is a species of frog in the family Hyperoliidae.
It is found in Ivory Coast and Ghana.
Its natural habitats are subtropical or tropical moist lowland forests and rivers.
It is threatened by habitat loss.

References

laurenti
Taxa named by Arne Schiøtz
Amphibians described in 1967
Taxonomy articles created by Polbot